Sergiyevka is a rural locality (a settlement) and the administrative center of Sergiyevskoye Rural Settlement, Krasnoyaruzhsky District, Belgorod Oblast, Russia. The population was 331 as of 2010. There are 5 streets.

Geography 
Sergiyevka is located 12 km south of Krasnaya Yaruga (the district's administrative centre) by road. Krisanovo is the nearest rural locality.

References 

Rural localities in Krasnoyaruzhsky District